Réjaumont (Rejaumont in Gascon) is a commune in the Gers département in southwestern France.

Geography

Population

History 
Réjaumont was, until the abolition of the aristocracy, in the county of Gaure. Circa 1660, Me Durant Dumont, canon of Ste-Marie d'Auch, bequeathed to the community a rent of 30 livres, to be distributed every two years by the consuls, to pay for the wedding of a poor girl or to allow a poor boy to start a business.

Politics and administration

See also
Communes of the Gers department

References

Communes of Gers